Seh Eshgaftan Sabzi (also Romanized as Seh Eshgaftān Sabzī; also known as Sarash Gaft, Sar Eshgaft, Seh Eshgaftān, and Seh Eshkaftan) is a village in Sardasht Rural District, Sardasht District, Dezful County, Khuzestan Province, Iran. At the 2006 census, its population was 23, in 4 families.

References 

Populated places in Dezful County